Hau Lung-pin (born 22 August 1952) is a Taiwanese politician. As a member of the New Party, he was elected to the Legislative Yuan in 1995, and resigned his seat to lead the Environmental Protection Administration in 2001. Hau stepped down from the EPA in 2003 and served as Mayor of Taipei from 2006 to 2014. He joined the Kuomintang (KMT) in 2006 and has served as vice chairman of the party in 2014 and from 2016 to 2020.

Early life
Hau Lung-pin is the son of former Premier and 4-star General (Chief of the General Staff, Army Commander-in-Chief), Hau Pei-tsun. He was born in Taiwan with ancestral roots in Yancheng, Jiangsu, China. He attended the National Taiwan University and graduated in 1975 with a B.S. in Agricultural Chemistry. He then earned a PhD in Food Science and Technology at the University of Massachusetts Amherst, in 1983.

When Hau returned to Taiwan after his doctoral studies, he taught as a professor (1983–88, Associate Professor; 1988–96, Professor) at the Graduate Institute of Food Science and Technology at National Taiwan University. As an educator, Hau won numerous awards including awards for excellence in teaching and in research.

Hau left the Kuomintang in the early 1990s to join the New Party. He was elected as a legislator in 1995, and served until his appointment as chief of the central government's Environmental Protection Administration in 2001 under President Chen Shui-bian. He resigned from that position in 2003.

Hau served as the secretary-general of the Red Cross in Taiwan and rejoined the Kuomintang in January 2006.

Taipei mayoralty

2006 Taipei mayoral election

On 27 May 2006, Hau was selected as the KMT's candidate for the Taipei mayoral election, winning 60% of the primary vote. He was subsequently elected Mayor of Taipei in the 2006 Republic of China municipal elections, defeating DPP candidate and former premier Frank Hsieh with 53.81% of the popular vote.

2010 Taipei mayoral election

Hau was reelected for a second term in November 2010 with 55.65% of the vote, defeating DPP candidate and former premier Su Tseng-chang.

Taiwanese fisherman shooting incident
Hau spoke at  Taipei City Hall shortly after the 2013 Guang Da Xing No. 28 incident involving Taiwan and the Philippines occurred on 9 May 2013 in disputed water of the South China Sea. In his comments, Hau urged the ROC government to take action against the Philippine government by suspending all exchanges with them, banning the recruitment of their workers, sending naval ships and extending their patrol beyond the exclusive economic zone to protect Taiwanese fishermen, retracting the 2013 Dragon Boat Festival invitation extended to the Philippines, (an event scheduled to take place in June), bringing the killers to justice, compensating the family of the shooting victim, and suspending the donation of two ROC ambulances to the Philippines. He also advised Taipei residents not to travel to the Philippines.

2013 China visit
In early July 2013, Hau led a delegation to attend the Shanghai-Taipei City Forum in Shanghai. He met with the Director of Taiwan Affairs Office Zhang Zhijun and Mayor of Shanghai Yang Xiong. The Taipei City Government and Shanghai City Government will sign several memorandums regarding libraries, district administration and "1999" city hotline service. The delegation also will discuss about cross-strait business, sports, education and media.

During his stay in Shanghai, he made a statement regarding the recently signed Cross-Strait Service Trade Agreement between Straits Exchange Foundation and Association for Relations Across the Taiwan Straits that China should establish mutual trust with Taiwan, reassure the Taiwanese people and strive for Taiwanese support on the issue.

Later political career

He was named a vice chairman of the Kuomintang in April 2014 and served until November.

2016 legislative election
Hau declared his candidacy for the Keelung City legislative seat in July 2015. However, he lost to Democratic Progressive Party candidate Tsai Shih-ying. Hau announced his intention to run for the position of Kuomintang chair on 21 January 2016, shortly after former party leader Eric Chu had resigned the position following defeat in the presidential elections. Hau dropped out of the chairmanship election a few days later. He was reappointed a vice chairman of the Kuomintang in May 2016.

2017 KMT chairmanship election
On 7 January 2017, he joined the KMT chairmanship election. The vote was held on 20 May 2017. He finished third in a field of six candidates.

2020 Kuomintang chairmanship election
Hau resigned his position as a vice chair of the Kuomintang on 15 January 2020, and declared his candidacy for the top post five days later, as party chairman Wu Den-yih had also resigned his post. In the chairmanship election held on 7 March 2020, Hau was defeated by Johnny Chiang.

Personal
Hau is married to Kao Lang-sin, with whom he has three children.

Notes

References

1952 births
Cheng Kung Senior High School alumni
National Taiwan University alumni
Mayors of Taipei
Kuomintang politicians in Taiwan
Living people
Taipei Members of the Legislative Yuan
New Party Members of the Legislative Yuan
Members of the 3rd Legislative Yuan
Members of the 4th Legislative Yuan
University of Massachusetts Amherst alumni
Taiwanese Ministers of Environment
Leaders of the New Party (Taiwan)